KRRI-LD (channel 25) is a low-power television station in Reno, Nevada, United States. The station is owned by Ngensolutions LLC.

History
Around October 2009, the bankruptcy court that liquidated Equity Media sold the then-KRRI-LP to Ngensolutions LLC. Ngensolutions entered into negotiations with Azteca América for an affiliation agreement for the Reno television market. KRRI-LP commenced broadcasting as an Azteca América affiliate during May 2010.

The station was licensed for digital operation on August 3, 2022, and changed its call sign to KRRI-LD.

On December 31, 2022, Azteca América ceased operations.

Television channels and stations established in 1998
RRI-LD
1998 establishments in Nevada
Spanish-language television stations in Nevada
Low-power television stations in the United States